Mandal in Andhra Pradesh, India is a sub-District.

History 
The Mandal system came into existence as an administrative reform, as part of reducing the size of erstwhile taluks and making them more effective and manageable. The decentralisation of taluks into mandals was done with a two-pronged strategy of modernising the revenue administration, record-keeping as well as further decentralising the panchayati raj system.

It was hoped that the division of erstwhile large Talukas into mandals could make them more manageable, and also that the administration of the state government, especially the revenue administration, will become monitored closely.

Talukas are large sub blocks in district. Almost every Taluka is divided into 4 or 5 mandals.

The AP government announced the formation of the Mandal system on May 25, 1985.

Mandals 

The table lists all the mandals in the 26 districts of Andhra Pradesh. The state comprises 680 mandals.

Erstwhile Taluks 
Talukas are large sub blocks in district.

Sources 
http://lsi.gov.in:8081/jspui/bitstream/123456789/2820/1/25191_1971_ANA.pdf

http://lsi.gov.in:8081/jspui/bitstream/123456789/2855/1/24986_1971_CHI.pdf

http://lsi.gov.in:8081/jspui/bitstream/123456789/2845/1/24985_1971_EAS.pdf

http://lsi.gov.in:8081/jspui/bitstream/123456789/2846/1/25301_1971_GUN.pdf

http://lsi.gov.in:8081/jspui/bitstream/123456789/2912/1/27190_1981_KRI.pdf

http://lsi.gov.in:8081/jspui/bitstream/123456789/2856/1/25299_1971_CUD.pdf

http://lsi.gov.in:8081/jspui/bitstream/123456789/2854/1/39369_1971_NEL.pdf

http://lsi.gov.in:8081/jspui/bitstream/123456789/2853/1/24980_1971_ONG.pdf

http://lsi.gov.in:8081/jspui/bitstream/123456789/2843/1/24974_1971_SRI.pdf

http://lsi.gov.in:8081/jspui/bitstream/123456789/2836/1/25213_1971_VIS.pdf

http://lsi.gov.in:8081/jspui/bitstream/123456789/2844/1/25302_1971_WES.pdf

https://shodhganga.inflibnet.ac.in/bitstream/10603/86906/9/09_chapter%203.pdf

See also 
Wikidata query to get current mandals of Andhra Pradesh with enwiki article link

References

 
Andhra Pradesh-related lists